"To Know Him Is to Love Him" is a song written by Phil Spector, inspired by words on his father's tombstone, "To Know Him Was to Love Him." It was first recorded by the only vocal group of which he was a member, the Teddy Bears. Their recording spent three weeks at No. 1 on the Billboard Hot 100 chart in 1958, while reaching No. 2 on the UK's New Musical Express chart. Peter & Gordon and Bobby Vinton later had hits with the song, with its title and lyrics changed to "To Know You Is to Love You". In 1987, the song was resurrected by Dolly Parton, Linda Ronstadt, and Emmylou Harris, whose Trio recording topped the U.S. country singles chart. The song is in 12/8 time.

Chart performance

All-time charts

Peter and Gordon version

In 1965, Peter and Gordon released a version of the song, titled "To Know You Is to Love You". Peter and Gordon's version spent 10 weeks on the UK Singles Chart, peaking at No. 5, while also reaching No. 5 on Canada's "RPM Play Sheet". In the United States, the song spent seven weeks on the Billboard Hot 100 chart, peaking at No. 24.

Charts

Bobby Vinton version

In 1969, Bobby Vinton released a version of the song, titled "To Know You Is to Love You". Vinton's version spent seven weeks on the Billboard Hot 100 chart, peaking at No. 34, while reaching No. 8 on Billboards Easy Listening chart, No. 16 on Canada's RPM 100, and No. 6 on RPMs Adult Contemporary chart.

Charts

Dolly Parton, Linda Ronstadt, and Emmylou Harris version

In 1987, Dolly Parton, Linda Ronstadt, and Emmylou Harris covered the song, including it on their Grammy Award-winning, multi-million selling Trio album, and releasing it as the album's first single. Their version hit No. 1 on the U.S. Hot Country Songs chart on May 16, 1987. The accompanying music video was played continuously on CMT and  directed by George Lucas – Ronstadt's boyfriend at that time.

Charts

Other versions 
The Beatles recorded two versions, both retitled "To Know Her Is to Love Her". One version was on their January 1962 audition tapes with Decca, not released during the band's existence and not included on Anthology 1. The second version was recorded on 16 July 1963 for the Pop Go The Beatles radio show and was not officially released until 1994, on their Live at the BBC compilation album. John Lennon recorded his own version of the song in 1973 ("To Know Her Is to Love Her"), but it would not see release until the 1986 posthumous compilation Menlove Ave.
In 1972, Jody Miller released her version as a single and on the album There's a Party Goin' On. Miller's version reached No. 18 on Billboards Hot Country Singles chart, No. 20 on Record Worlds Country Singles Chart, and No. 21 on the Cash Box Country Top 75 chart. It also reached No. 12 on Canada's RPM Country Playlist.
In 2006, Amy Winehouse included her recording of the song as the B-side to the UK release of her single, "You Know I'm No Good".

References

External links
"To Know Him Is to Love Him" lyrics @ Dollyon-line.com

1958 singles
1987 singles
Billboard Hot 100 number-one singles
Cashbox number-one singles
Song recordings produced by Phil Spector
Peter and Gordon songs
Song recordings produced by John Burgess
Emmylou Harris songs
The Beatles songs
Jill Johnson songs
Jody Miller songs
Dolly Parton songs
Linda Ronstadt songs
Bobby Vinton songs
Amy Winehouse songs
Songs written by Phil Spector
Warner Records singles
1958 songs
Kikki Danielsson songs
Doré Records singles
Capitol Records singles
Epic Records singles